Alpinia tonrokuensis (屯鹿月桃) is a species of plant endemic to northern Taiwan. They are 2.5–4.5 meters in height, with oblong to lanceolate leaves, 55–82 × 12–17 cm.

References

 Hayata, 1920 In: Icon. Pl. Formosan. 9: 123
 eFloras entry
 Digital Taiwan images

tonrokuensis
Taxa named by Bunzō Hayata